Domonkos or Domokos was a Hungarian prelate and politician, who served as Archbishop of Esztergom between 1037 and 1040. His name is appeared in a diploma of Bakonybél Abbey from 1037. He was the last archbishop for Stephen I of Hungary. According to the source, Domonkos II "share the King's problems of throne succession of uncertainty and conspiracies against the monarch".

Bibliography 

|-

Archbishops of Esztergom
11th-century Roman Catholic archbishops in Hungary
Hungarian politicians
11th-century Hungarian people